Max Howell (26 December 1921 – 3 October 2012) was a former Australian rules footballer who played with Carlton in the Victorian Football League (VFL).

Notes

External links 

Max Howell's profile at Blueseum

1921 births
2012 deaths
Carlton Football Club players
Australian rules footballers from Victoria (Australia)
Australian headmasters
Benalla Football Club players